Dover is an unincorporated community within Guysborough County in  Nova Scotia, Canada.

Parks 
Black Duck Cove Provincial Park

References 

Villages in Nova Scotia
Communities in Guysborough County, Nova Scotia